The highest-selling albums and EPs in the United States are ranked in the Billboard 200, which is published by Billboard magazine. The data are compiled by Nielsen Soundscan based on each album's weekly physical and digital sales. In 2013, a total of 44 albums claimed the top position of the chart. One of which, singer-songwriter Taylor Swift's album Red started its peak in late 2012.

Justin Timberlake's album The 20/20 Experience was the longest-running album of the year, staying atop the chart for three consecutive weeks. Other albums with extended chart runs include Red by Taylor Swift, Babel by Mumford & Sons, Random Access Memories by Daft Punk, Magna Carta Holy Grail by Jay-Z, Crash My Party by Luke Bryan and The Marshall Mathers LP 2 by Eminem; each spent two weeks on the top position. Throughout 2013, only two acts achieved multiple number-one albums on the chart: Justin Timberlake with The 20/20 Experience and The 20/20 Experience – 2 of 2, and Luke Bryan with Spring Break...Here to Party and Crash My Party.

The 20/20 Experience sold 968,000 copies in its first week following its release, becoming the highest-selling album during the debut week. Eminem's The Marshall Mathers LP 2 sold 792,000 copies in its first week, making it the second album with the highest sales during the opening week. Meanwhile, Beyoncé notched her fifth number-one album with her eponymous album; it was also the largest debut sales week for a female artist in 2013, and outselling Knowles' previous albums' debut figures. Knowles is the only female artist in Billboard 200 history to have her first five albums reach number one.

The 20/20 Experience was the biggest-selling album of 2013, with 2,373,000 copies sold in the US.

Chart history

See also
2013 in music
List of Billboard Hot 100 number-one singles of 2013
List of Billboard number-one country albums of 2013

References

External links 
Current Billboard 200 chart
Billboard Chart Archives – Billboard 200 (2013)

2013
United States Albums